St. Francis Xavier's Cathedral or Geraldton Cathedral is a Roman Catholic cathedral in Geraldton, Western Australia. It is the seat of Bishop of Geraldton.

Construction work on the cathedral began on 20 June 1916. The first phase ended with the construction of the nave and the twin towers, topped by two domes, and was completed in 1918.  The second phase involved the construction of the crypt, sanctuary and Sisters' Chapel  in 1926.  The third and final phase, the dome, the transepts and the sacristy were completed and formally opened on 28 August 1938. It is the largest and most imposing work of Priest and Architect John Hawes.

From 2015 to 2017  a  $10m restoration, conservation and enhancement project was undertaken.

Gallery

See also
Roman Catholicism in Australia
St. Francis Xavier's Cathedral

References

Roman Catholic cathedrals in Western Australia
Geraldton
Roman Catholic churches completed in 1938
State Register of Heritage Places in the City of Greater Geraldton
20th-century Roman Catholic church buildings in Australia